Faniello is a surname. Notable people with the name include:

Claudia Faniello (born 1988), Maltese singer
Fabrizio Faniello (born 1981), Maltese singer